Kizzy may refer to:

Kizzy (entertainer) (born Kizzy Yuanda Constance Getrouw), a Dutch actress, singer-songwriter and television host
Kizzy Crawford or "Kizzy", a Barbadian-Welsh singer
Kizzy Waller (later Kizzy Lea), a character in the TV miniseries Roots
Kizzy "Kiz" Shoemaker, a character from Afterworld (web series)
Kizzy, a character from Snobs (TV series)
Kizzy, a character from the play Turn Left at Gilgamesh
Kizzy (TV series), a 1976 BBC adaptation of Rumer Godden's novel The Diddakoi
Kizzy: Mum at 14, a  BBC Three documentary about an underage mother, Kizzy Kay Neal